In ethics, intrinsic value is a property of anything that is valuable on its own. Intrinsic value is in contrast to instrumental value (also known as extrinsic value), which is a property of anything that derives its value from a relation to another intrinsically valuable thing. Intrinsic value is always something that an object has "in itself" or "for its own sake", and is an intrinsic property. An object with intrinsic value may be regarded as an end, or in Kantian terminology, as an end-in-itself.

The term "intrinsic value" is used in axiology, a branch of philosophy that studies value (including both ethics and aesthetics). All major normative ethical theories identify something as being intrinsically valuable. For instance, for a virtue ethicist, eudaimonia (human flourishing, sometimes translated as "happiness") has intrinsic value, whereas things that bring you happiness (such as having a family) may be merely instrumentally valuable. Similarly, consequentialists may identify pleasure, the lack of pain, and/or the fulfillment of one's preferences as having intrinsic value, making actions that produce them merely instrumentally valuable. On the other hand, proponents of deontological ethics argue that morally right actions (those that respect moral duty to others) are always intrinsically valuable, regardless of their consequences.

Other names for intrinsic value are terminal value, essential value, principle value, or ultimate importance.

An 'end'
In philosophy and ethics, an end, or telos, is the ultimate goal in a series of steps. For example, according to Aristotle the end of everything we do is happiness. It is contrasted to a means, which is something that helps you achieve that goal. For example, money or power may be said to be a means to the end of happiness. Nevertheless, some objects may be ends and means at the same time.

End is roughly similar, and often used as a synonym, for the following concepts:
 Purpose or aim: in its most general sense the anticipated result that guides action.
Goal or objective consists of a projected state of affairs a person or a system plans or intends to achieve or bring about.

Life stances and intrinsic value
This table attempts to summarize the main intrinsic value of different life stances and other views, although there may be great diversity within them:

Quantity
There may be zero, one, or several things in the world with intrinsic value.

Intrinsic nihilism, or simply nihilism (from Latin nihil, 'nothing') holds that there are zero quantities with intrinsic value.

Intrinsic aliquidism 

Intrinsic aliquidism, or simply aliquidism (from Latin aliquid, 'something') holds that there is one or more. This may be of several quantities, ranging from one single to all possible.

Intrinsic monism (from Greek monos, 'single') holds that there is one thing with intrinsic value. This view may hold only life stances that accept this object as intrinsically valuable.
Intrinsic multism (from Latin multus, 'many') holds that there are many things with intrinsic value. In other words, this view may hold the instrinsic values of several life stances as intrinsically valuable.
Intrinsic panism (from Greek pan, 'everything') holds that everything has an intrinsic value.
Among followers of aliquidistic life stances regarding more than one thing as having intrinsic value, these may be regarded as equally intrinsically valuable or unequally so. However, in practice, they may in any case be unequally valued because of their instrumental values resulting in unequal whole values.

Intrinsic multism
This view may hold the intrinsic values of several life stances as intrinsically valuable. Note the difference between this and regarding several intrinsic values as more or less instrumentally valuable, since intrinsic monistic views also may hold other intrinsic values than their own chosen one as valuable, but then only to the degree other intrinsic values contribute indirectly to their own chosen intrinsic value.

The most simple form of intrinsic multism is intrinsic bi-ism (from Latin two), which holds two objects as having intrinsic value, such as happiness and virtue. Humanism is an example of a life stance that accepts that several things have intrinsic value.

Multism may not necessarily include the feature of intrinsic values to have a negative side—e.g., the feature of utilitarianism to accept both pain and pleasure as of intrinsic value, since they may be viewed as different sides of the same coin.

Unspecified aliquidism

Ietsism (Dutch: ietsisme, 'somethingism') is a term used for a range of beliefs held by people who, on the one hand, inwardly suspect—or indeed believe—that there is “more between Heaven and Earth” than we know about, but on the other hand do not accept or subscribe to the established belief system, dogma or view of the nature of God offered by any particular religion.

In this sense, it may roughly be regarded as aliquidism, without further specification. For instance, most life stances include the acceptance of "there is something, some meaning of life, something that is an end-in-itself or something more to existence, and it is," assuming various objects or "truths," while ietsism, on the other hand, accepts "there is something," without further assumption to it.

Total intrinsic value
The total intrinsic value of an object is the product of its average intrinsic value, average value intensity, and value duration. It may be either an absolute or relative value. The total intrinsic value and total instrumental value together make the total whole value of an object.

Concrete and abstract
The object with intrinsic value, the end, may be both a concrete object or an abstract object.

Concrete
In the case where concrete objects are accepted as ends, they may be either single particulars or generalized to all particulars of one or more universals. However, the majority of life stances choose all particulars of universals as ends. For instance, Humanism doesn't assume individual humans as ends but rather all humans of humanity.

Continuum
When generalizing multiple particulars of a single universal it may not be certain whether the end is actually the individual particulars or the rather abstract universal. In such cases, a life stance may rather be a continuum between having a concrete and abstract end.

This may render life stances of being both intrinsic multistic and intrinsic monistic at the same time. Such a quantity contradiction, however, may be of only minor practic significance, since splitting an end into many ends decreases the whole value but increases the value intensity.

Types of intrinsic value

Absolute and relative
There may be a distinction between absolute and relative ethic value regarding intrinsic value.

Relative intrinsic value is subjective, depending on individual and cultural views and/or the individual choice of life stance. Absolute intrinsic value, on the other hand, is philosophically absolute and independent of individual and cultural views, as well as independent on whether it discovered or not what object has it.

There is an ongoing discussion on whether an absolute intrinsic value exists at all, for instance in pragmatism. In pragmatism, John Dewey's empirical approach did not accept intrinsic value as an inherent or enduring property of things. He saw it as an illusory product of our continuous ethic valuing activity as purposive beings. When held across only some contexts, Dewey held that goods are only intrinsic relative to a situation. In other words, he only believed in relative intrinsic value, but not any absolute intrinsic value. He held that across all contexts, goodness is best understood as instrumental value, with no contrasting intrinsic goodness. In other words, Dewey claimed that anything can only be of intrinsic value if it is a contributory good.

Positive and negative
There may be both positive and negative value regarding intrinsic value, wherein something of positive intrinsic value is pursued or maximized, while something of negative intrinsic value is avoided or minimized. For instance, in utilitarianism, pleasure has positive intrinsic value and suffering has negative intrinsic value.

Similar concepts 
Intrinsic value is mainly used in ethics, but the concept is also used in philosophy, with terms that essentially may refer to the same concept.

As "ultimate importance" it is what a sentient being relates to in order to constitute a life stance.
It is synonymous with the meaning of life, as this may be expressed as what is meaningful or valuable in life. However, meaning of life is more vague, with other uses as well.
Summum bonum is basically its equivalent in medieval philosophy.
The relative intrinsic value is roughly synonymous with the ethic ideal.
Inherent value may be regarded as a first grade instrumental value when personal experience is the intrinsic value.

See also 
 Animal ethics
 Autotelic
 Extrinsic value (ethics)
 Ophelimity
 Value system
 Value theory

References

External links 

 Discussion of different types of values

Concepts in ethics
Axiological theories
Value (ethics)